The Aviones or Auiones (*Awioniz meaning "island people") were one of the Nerthus-worshipping Germanic tribes of the 1st century mentioned by Tacitus in Germania, and they lived either in the southern Jutland Peninsula, or on Öland. They are mentioned in Widsith as Eowan.

Tacitus wrote of the group as defended by rivers and forests:

(Original Latin) "Reudigni deinde et Aviones et Anglii et Varini et Eudoses et Suardones et Nuithones fluminibus aut silvis muniuntur. Nec quicquam notabile in singulis, nisi quod in commune Nerthum, id est Terram matrem, colunt eamque intervenire rebus hominum, invehi populis arbitrantur. ..."  --Tacitus, Germania, 40.

(English translation) "There follow in order the Reudignians, and Aviones, and Angles, and Varinians, and Eudoses, and Suardones and Nuithones; all defended by rivers or forests. Nor in one of these nations does aught remarkable occur, only that they universally join in the worship of Herthum (Nerthus); that is to say, the Mother Earth."--Tacitus, Germania, 40, translated 1877 by Church and Brodribb.

Thus, according to Tacitus, the Aviones lived on the Jutland Peninsula, near the Angles; if their name is indeed related to islands, they possibly lived on the North Frisian Islands. However, according to Kendrick, they probably lived on Öland. It is not only the meaning Island dwellers that connects them to the island Öland (meaning "Island land"), but also the Old English name for the island which is Eowland (mentioned by Wulfstan of Hedeby), "the land of the Eowan".

See also
List of Germanic peoples

References

Early Germanic peoples